Virosphere (virus diversity, virus world, global virosphere) is the viral part of the biosphere, namely the pool of viruses in all hosts and all environments on planet earth.

Virosphere may also refer to a pool of certain group of viruses according to their host - prokaryotic virosphere, archaeal virosphere, Invertebrate  virosphere, type of genome  - RNA virosphere,  dsDNA virosphere or ecological niche - marine virosphere

Viral genome diversity 
The scope of viral genome diversity is enormous compared to cellular life. Cellular life including all known organisms have double stranded DNA genome. Whereas viruses have one of at least 7 different types of genetic information, namely dsDNA, ssDNA, dsRNA, ssRNA+, ssRNA-, ssRNA-RT, dsDNA-RT. Each type of genetic information has its specific manner of mRNA synthesis. Baltimore classification is a system providing overview on these mechanisms for each type of genome. Moreover, in contrast to cellular organisms, viruses don't have universally conserved sequences in their genomes  to be compared by.

Viral genome size varies approximately 1000 fold. Smallest viruses may consist of only from 1–2 kb genome coding for 1 or 2 genes and it is enough for them to successfully evolve and travel through space and time by infecting and replicating (make copies of their own) in its host. Two most basic viral genes are replicase gene and capsid protein gene, as soon as virus has them it represents a biological entity able to evolve and reproduce in cellular life forms. Some viruses may have only replicase gene and use capsid gene of other e.g. endogenous virus. Most viral genomes are 10-100kb, whereas bacteriophages tend to have larger genomes carrying parts of genome translation machinery genes from their host. In contrast, RNA viruses have smaller genomes, with maximum 35kb by coronavirus. RNA genomes have higher mutation rate, that is why their genome has to be small enough in order not to harbour to many mutations, which would disrupt the essential genes or their parts. The function of the vast majority of viral genes remain unknown und the approaches to study have to be developed. The total number of viral genes is much higher, than the total number of genes of three domains of life all together,  which practically means viruses encode most of the genetic diversity on the planet.

Viral host diversity 

Viruses are cosmopolites, they are able to infect  every cell and every organism on planet earth. However different viruses infect different hosts.  Viruses are host specific as they need to replicate (reproduce) within a host cell. In order to enter the cell viral particle needs to interact with a receptor on the surface of its host cell. For the process of replication many viruses use their own replicases, but for protein synthesis they are dependent on their host cell protein synthesis machinery. Thus, host specificity is a limiting factor for viral reproduction.

Some viruses have extremely narrow host range and are able to infect only 1 certain strain of 1 bacterial species, whereas others are able to infect hundreds or even thousands of different hosts. For example cucumber mosaic virus (CMV) can use more than 1000 different plant species as a host. Members of viral families like Rhabdoviridae infect hosts from different kingdoms e.g. plants and vertebrates. And members of genera Psimunavirus and Myohalovirus infect hosts from different domains of life e.g. bacteria and archaea.

Viral capsid diversity 

Capsid is the outer protecting shell or scaffold of a viral genome. Capsid enclosing viral nucleic acid make up viral particle or a virion. Capsid is made of protein and sometimes has lipid layer harboured from the host cell while exiting it. Capsid proteins are highly symmetrical and assemble within a host cell by their own due to the fact, that assembled capsid is more thermodynamically favourable state, than separate randomly floating proteins. The most viral capsids have icosahedral or helical symmetry, whereas bacteriophages have complex structure consisting of icosahedral head and helical tail including baseplate and fibers important for host cell recognition and penetration. Viruses of archaea infecting hosts living in extreme environments like boiling water, highly saline or acidic environments have totally different capsid shapes and structures. The variety of capsid structures of Archaeal viruses includes lemon shaped viruses Bicaudaviridae of family and Salterprovirus genus, spindle form Fuselloviridae, bottle shaped Ampullaviridae, egg shaped Guttaviridae.

Capsid size of a virus differs dramatically depending on its genome size and capsid type.Icosahedral capsids are measured by diameter, whereas helical and complex are measured by length and diameter. Viruses differ in capsid size in a spectrum from 10 to more than 1000 nm. The smallest viruses are ssRNA viruses like Parvovirus. They have icosahedral capsid approximately 14 nm in diameter. Whereas the biggest currently known viruses are Pithovirus, Mamavirus and Pandoravirus. Pithovirus is a flask-shaped virus 1500 nm long and 500 nm in diameter, Pandoravirus is an oval-shaped virus1000nm (1 micron) long and Mamavirus is an icosahedral virus reaching approximately 500 nm in diameter. Example of how capsid size depends on the size of viral genome can be shown by comparing icosahedral viruses  - the smallest viruses are 15-30 nm in diameter have genomes in range of 5 to 15 kb (kilo bases or kilo base pairs depending on type of genome), and the biggest are near 500 nm in diameter and their genomes are also the largest, they exceed1Mb (million base pairs).

Viral evolution 
Viral evolution or evolution of viruses presumably started from the beginning of the second age of RNA world, when different types of viral genomes arose through the transition from RNA- RT –DNA, which also emphasises that viruses played a critical role in the emergence of DNA and predate LUCA  The abundance and variety of viral genes also imply that their origin predates LUCA. As viruses do not share unifying common genes they are considered to be polyphyletic or having multiple origins as opposed to one common origin as all cellular life forms have. Virus evolution is more complex as it is highly prone to horizontal gene transfer, genetic recombination and reassortment. Moreover viral evolution should always be considered as a process of co-evolution with its host, as a host cell is inevitable for virus reproduction and hence, evolution.

Viral abundance 
Viruses are the most abundant biological entities, there are 10^31 viruses on our planet. Viruses are capable of infecting all organisms on earth and they are able to survive in much harsher environments, than any cellular life form. As viruses can not be included in the tree of life there is no separate structure illustrating viral diversity and evolutionary relationships. However, viral ubiquity can be imagined as a virosphere covering the whole tree of life.

Nowadays we are entering the phase of exponential viral discovery. The genome sequencing technologies including high-throughput methods allow fast and cheap sequencing of environmental samples. The vast majority of the sequences from any environment, both from wild nature and human made, reservoirs are new. It practically means that during over a 100 years of virus research from the discovery of bacteriophages - viruses of bacteria in 1917 until current time we only scratched on a surface of a great viral diversity. The classic methods like viral culture used previously allowed to observe physical virions or viral particles using electron microscope, they also allowed to gathering information about their physical and molecular properties. New methods deal only with the genetic information of viruses.

See also 

 virus
 virology
 Virome
 viral evolution
 virus classification
 list of virus families
 list of virus genera
 list of virus species

References

External links 
 Welcome to the Virosphere
 Virolution
 A Planet of Viruses, Carl Zimmer

Pathogen genomics
Viruses